Juguang (Wade–Giles: Chü-kuang) may refer to:

Juguang, Lienchiang, Republic of China (Taiwan)
Juguang Tower a tower in Jincheng Township, Kinmen County, Republic of China (Taiwan)
Wanda-Zhonghe-Shulin line, an under construction line of the Taipei Metro which will have a branch line possibly named Juguang branch line.

See also
Jiuguang, a Chinese department store chain